Brigitta (minor planet designation: 450 Brigitta) is a typical Main belt asteroid. It is a member of the Eos family.

It was discovered by Max Wolf and A. Schwassmann on 10 October 1899 in Heidelberg.

References

External links
 
 

Eos asteroids
Brigitta
Brigitta
Brigitta
CSU-type asteroids (Tholen)
18991010